Valdoviño is a municipality in  the province of A Coruña in the autonomous community of Galicia in northwestern Spain. It is located in the comarca of Ferrol. Valdoviño has a population of 6,926 inhabitants (INE, 2011).

Geography 

The granite coast of Valdoviño  is home to several sandy beaches, a large lagoon and a lighthouse.

Parroquias 
There are eight Parroquias:

Lago (Santiago)
Loira (San Pedro)
Meirás (San Vicente)
Pantín (Santiago)
O Sequeiro (Santa María)
Valdoviño (Santalla)
Vilaboa (San Vicente)
Vilarrube (San Martiño)

See also 
Ferrolterra
The "Fragas" of the River Eume Natural Park

References

External links
  Official website 

Municipalities in the Province of A Coruña
Beaches of Galicia (Spain)